Cogry-Kilbride is a village in County Antrim, Northern Ireland, about 4 km west of Ballyclare. The village encompasses the two townlands of Cogry and Kilbride. It had a population of 1,195 people in the 2001 census. Kilbride is also a civil parish. It is situated in Antrim and Newtownabbey district.

History
The names Cogry (also written as Coggrey) and Kilbride come  and Cill Bhríde meaning "Bríd's church".

Cogry was originally a mill village built and owned by the McMeekin family during the mid 19th century, who also owned Cogry Mill. But it declined in the 1950s with the closure of the mill, The mill has since been purchased in 2019 by a property developer but the site currently lies dormant. In recent years the village has been revitalised by housing development. As the two settlements are so close they are often treated as one.

2001 Census 
Cogry/Kilbride is classified as a Village by the NI Statistics and Research Agency (NISRA) (i.e. with population between 1,000 and 2,250 people). On Census day (29 April 2001) there were 1,195 people living in Cogry/Kilbride. Of these:
26.3% were aged under 16 years and 7.3% were aged 60 and over
50.2% of the population were male and 49.8% were female
1.5% were from a Catholic background and 93.7% were from a Protestant background
2.7% of people aged 16–74 were unemployed

For more details see: NI Neighbourhood Information Service

See also
List of civil parishes of County Antrim

References 
Notes

Sources
Draft Belfast Metropolitan Area Plan 2015

Villages in County Antrim
Civil parishes of County Antrim